Karpatka is a traditional Polish cream pie filled with vanilla milk pudding or custard. It is sometimes composed of two different types of pastry; the base layer could be made of choux pastry or shortcrust pastry and can be thinly covered with marmalade and thick cream, then topped with a sheet of choux pastry. The dessert takes its name from the mountain-like pleated shape of the powdered choux pastry, which resembled the snowy peaks of the Carpathian Mountains – Karpaty in Polish. The dish is often dusted with icing sugar. 
 
The origins of the desert are unclear; it most likely emerged at the turn of the 1950s and 1960s, but its popularity only became widespread in the 1970s and 1980s. The official name "karpatka" was first coined or recorded in 1972 by a group of philology students. Traditionally, one large slice of the pie was served with coffee or tea.

There are "karpatka" baking mixes available in shops across Poland. In 1995, "Karpatka" became a trademark registered for a company called Delecta for the determination of cream powder in the Polish Patent Office.

See also
 List of Polish desserts
 Wuzetka
 Crumb cake
 Napoleonka
 Poppy seed roll

References

Custard desserts
Polish desserts
Choux pastry